The First Universalist Society of Salem is a historic Universalist former church building at 211 Bridge Street in Salem, Massachusetts.

History
The congregation was founded in 1805 after seven local people with an interest in Universalism attended a lecture by Rev. John Murray, a founder of Universalism. The current church building was constructed in 1808 with Rev. Hosea Ballou, a founder of the Universalist Church, laying the cornerstone of the Federal style building. Inside the building, the Hutchings organ was constructed in 1888 with 1,200 pipes. The church was added to the National Register of Historic Places in 1983. The church closed in 2016, merging with First Parish, UU, in Beverly, MA.

See also
Bessie Monroe House, located behind the church
National Register of Historic Places listings in Salem, Massachusetts
National Register of Historic Places listings in Essex County, Massachusetts

References

External links

 First Universalist Society of Salem website
A semi-centennial address delivered in the Universalist Church, Salem, Mass., Thursday, August 4, 1859 by Lemuel Willis (Register Press, 1859)
 The historical records of the First Universalist Church in Salem are in the Andover-Harvard Theological Library at Harvard Divinity School in Cambridge, Massachusetts.

Unitarian Universalist churches in Massachusetts
Churches on the National Register of Historic Places in Massachusetts
Churches in Salem, Massachusetts
Tourist attractions in Salem, Massachusetts
National Register of Historic Places in Salem, Massachusetts
Churches completed in 1808
Federal architecture in Massachusetts
Religious organizations established in 1805
Religious organizations disestablished in 2016